Patricia Edwina Victoria Knatchbull, 2nd Countess Mountbatten of Burma, Lady Brabourne,  (née Mountbatten; 14 February 1924 – 13 June 2017) was a British peeress and a third cousin of Queen Elizabeth II. She was the elder daughter of Admiral of the Fleet the 1st Earl Mountbatten of Burma and of heiress Edwina Ashley (a patrilineal descendant of the Earls of Shaftesbury, first ennobled in 1661). She was the elder sister of Lady Pamela Hicks, a first cousin of Prince Philip, Duke of Edinburgh, and the last surviving baptismal sponsor to King Charles III. She was a great-great-great-granddaughter of Queen Victoria.

Lady Mountbatten succeeded her father when he was assassinated in 1979, as his peerages had been created with special remainder to his daughters and their heirs male. This inheritance accorded her the title of countess and a seat in the House of Lords, where she remained until 1999, when the House of Lords Act 1999 removed most hereditary peers from the House.

Marriage and children
On 26 October 1946 she married John Knatchbull, 7th Baron Brabourne (9 November 1924 – 23 September 2005), at the time an aide to her father in the Far East. They had met after Patricia, having served in the Women's Royal Naval Service, was commissioned in 1945 as a third officer and was serving in the Supreme Allied Headquarters, South East Asia. The wedding took place at Romsey Abbey in the presence of members of the Royal Family. Her bridesmaids were Princess Elizabeth, Princess Margaret, Lady Pamela Mountbatten (the bride's younger sister), and Princess Alexandra, daughter of the Duke and Duchess of Kent.

Later they became one of the few married couples each of whom held a peerage in their own right, and whose descendants inherited titles through both. They had eight children:
Norton Louis Philip Knatchbull, 3rd Earl Mountbatten of Burma (born 8 October 1947), married Penelope Meredith Eastwood (born 16 April 1953) and have three children.
The Hon. Michael-John Ulick Knatchbull (born 24 May 1950), producer and editor, married Melissa Clare Owen (born 12 November 1960), daughter of judge Sir John Arthur Dalziel Owen, on 1 June 1985 and they divorced in 1997. He married Susan Penelope "Penny" Jane Henderson, née Coates (born 23 October 1959, daughter of Stephen Cedric Coates, civil engineer and businessman) on 6 March 1999 and had one daughter and divorced on 13 February 2006.
The Hon. Anthony Knatchbull (born and died 6 April 1952)
Lady Joanna Edwina Doreen Knatchbull (born 5 March 1955), married French Baron Hubert Pernot du Breuil (2 February 1956 – 6 September 2004) on 3 November 1984 and had one daughter; divorced in 1995; married Azriel Zuckerman (born 18 January 1943 in Bucharest, Romania, and educated at the University of Oxford) on 19 November 1995 and had one son.
Lady Amanda Patricia Victoria Knatchbull (born 26 June 1957), married Charles Vincent Ellingworth (born 7 February 1957) on 31 October 1987 and has three sons.
The Hon. Philip Wyndham Ashley Knatchbull (born 2 December 1961), married Atalanta Vereker née Cowan (born 20 June 1962), daughter of John Cowan, on 16 March 1991 and had 2 daughters including Daisy Knatchbull; married Wendy Amanda Leach (born 20 July 1966), daughter of Robin H. Leach, of Ugley Park, Ugley, Essex, on 29 June 2002 and had two sons.
The Hon. Nicholas Timothy Charles Knatchbull (18 November 1964 – 27 August 1979), killed by an IRA bomb.
The Hon. Timothy Nicholas Sean Knatchbull (born 18 November 1964), married Isabella Julia Norman (born 9 January 1971), a great-great-granddaughter of the 4th Earl of Bradford, on 11 July 1998 and had three daughters and two sons.

As Lady Brabourne during her father's lifetime, her immediate family became closely involved in the consideration of a future consort for her first cousin once-removed, Charles, Prince of Wales. In early 1974, Lord Mountbatten began corresponding with the eldest son of Queen Elizabeth II and Prince Philip about a potential marriage to Lady Brabourne's daughter, Amanda. Charles wrote to Lady Brabourne (who was also his godmother), about his interest in her daughter, to which she replied approvingly, though suggesting that a courtship was premature. Amanda Knatchbull declined the marriage proposal of Charles in 1980, following the assassination of her grandfather.

Activities
Patricia was educated in Malta, England, and at the Hewitt School in New York City. In 1943, at age 19, she entered the Women's Royal Naval Service as a Signal Rating and served in Combined Operations bases in Britain, including HMS Tormentor. She was then commissioned as a third officer in 1945 and serving in the Supreme Allied Headquarters, South East Asia.

In 1973 she was appointed Deputy Lieutenant for the County of Kent; she was also a serving magistrate and was involved with numerous service organisations including SOS Children's Villages UK, of which she was a Patron; the Order of St John, of which she was a Dame; and the Countess Mountbatten's Own Legion of Frontiersmen of the Commonwealth, of which she was a Patron.

On 15 June 1974, she succeeded her distant cousin Lady Patricia Ramsay, formerly HRH Princess Patricia of Connaught, as Colonel-in-Chief of Princess Patricia's Canadian Light Infantry, for whom the regiment was named when Princess Patricia's father, the Duke of Connaught, was Governor General of Canada during the First World War. Despite her succeeding to an earldom in her own right as Countess Mountbatten of Burma on the death of her father in 1979, she preferred that the officers and men of her regiment address her as Lady Patricia. She was succeeded by The Right Honourable Adrienne Clarkson on 17 March 2007. On 28 August 2007, the Governor General of Canada presented her with the Canadian Meritorious Service Cross for her services as Colonel-in-Chief of Princess Patricia's Light Infantry.

Patricia was in the boat which was blown up by the IRA off the shores of Mullaghmore, County Sligo, in August 1979, killing her 14-year-old son Nicholas; her father; her mother-in-law, the Dowager Baroness Brabourne; and 15-year-old Paul Maxwell, a boat-boy from County Fermanagh. She, her husband, and their son Timothy were injured but survived the attack. Following the incident the Countess became Patron and, later, President of The Compassionate Friends, a self-help charitable organisation of bereaved parents in the UK.

In June 2012, at the time of Queen Elizabeth II's first visit to the Republic of Ireland, Countess Mountbatten said the Queen had her full support for meeting Martin McGuinness, who had been a high-ranking member of the IRA. "I think it's wonderful ... I'm hugely grateful that we have come to a point where we can behave responsibly and positively", she is reported to have said. In September 2012, she unveiled a memorial to the work of the Combined Operations Pilotage Parties at Hayling Island in Hampshire.

Death and funeral
Countess Mountbatten died at her home in Mersham, Kent, aged 93. Her funeral service took place on 27 June 2017 at St Paul's Church, Knightsbridge, and was attended by the Queen, the Duke of Edinburgh and other senior members of the royal family. Her casket was borne by a party of pall bearers from Princess Patricia's Canadian Light Infantry, who were in London on public duties. She was buried in the Knatchbull family plot in Mersham churchyard.

Colonelcy-in-chief
 Princess Patricia's Canadian Light Infantry (formerly, now The Right Honourable Adrienne Clarkson)

Bibliography

References

External links

Regiments.org on Princess Patricia's Canadian Light Infantry
 About Us - Patrons of The Compassionate Friends

1924 births
2017 deaths
English people of German-Jewish descent
Military personnel from London
Knatchbull
Dames of Grace of the Order of St John
Commanders of the Order of the British Empire
Daughters of British earls
Hereditary women peers
British countesses
Brabourne
Recipients of the Meritorious Service Decoration
Royal Navy officers of World War II
Deputy Lieutenants of Kent
People associated with the Royal National College for the Blind
Patricia
Patricia
Ashley-Cooper family
British women in World War II
Hewitt School alumni
Women's Royal Naval Service officers
Women's Royal Naval Service ratings
Mountbatten of Burma